Recreation Residences or "Forest Service Cabins" are private residences enabled by the 1915 Occupancy Permits Act on land that later became the US Forest Service. The Recreation Residence Program authorizes the public to construct recreational cabins subject to various permit terms. As of 2014, there are over 14,000 Recreational Residences on Forest Service land and the owners of these residences are represented by the National Forest Homeowners group.
Recreation cabins are sometimes misused and have been a source of controversy, but the program was renewed with the passage of 2014 Cabin Fee Act (CFA) as part of the 2015 National Defense Authorization Act.

References

United States Forest Service